William Percy Grosvenor (18 July 1869 – 5 June 1948) was a British sport shooter who competed in the 1912 Summer Olympics and  1920 Summer Olympics.

Grosvenor was born 18 July 1869 in Hackney, London the son of William and Emily Harriett Grosvenor.

In 1912 he won the silver medal with the British team in the team clay pigeons competition. In the individual trap event he finished 16th. At the end of 1912 he married Ida Vincent in Stroud Green, Haringey, London. Eight years later he finished fourth as a member of the British team in the team clay pigeons competition.

References

External links
William Grosvenor's profile at databaseOlympics

1869 births
1948 deaths
British male sport shooters
Olympic shooters of Great Britain
Shooters at the 1912 Summer Olympics
Shooters at the 1920 Summer Olympics
Shooters at the 1924 Summer Olympics
Olympic silver medallists for Great Britain
Trap and double trap shooters
People from Hackney Central
Olympic medalists in shooting
Medalists at the 1912 Summer Olympics
Sportspeople from London
20th-century British people